Trevor Raymond Gripper (born 28 December 1975) is a former Zimbabwean cricketer. He was born in 1975 in Salisbury - now Harare.

Gripper was a somewhat solid opening batsman, who once spent four hours 23 minutes inching his way to 28 in a match against England A. However, his off-spin bowling has also proved useful, and in first-class cricket he may fairly be considered an all-rounder, with his batting average above 33 and his bowling average below 32.

Gripper made his first-class debut for a Matabeleland Invitation XI during Worcestershire's 1996/97 tour of Zimbabwe, by scoring 45. However, he did not play another match at that level until the aforementioned game against England A in February 1999.

Gripper made his Test match debut in October 1999 against Australia at Harare; the selectors' decision was somewhat surprising since at the time Gripper had still not recorded a first-class century. He made 60 in the second innings. His maiden Test hundred came against Bangladesh in 2001, as Zimbabwe piled up 542/7 declared.

Although only taking six wickets in his test career, he will be forever remembered as the bowler who dismissed Matthew Hayden for 380 runs (Second highest runs scored in a Test Match) in the 1st Test between Australia v Zimbabwe at Perth in October 2003. 

He has played domestic cricket for Matabeleland, Manicaland and Mashonaland, and it was for the latter that he made his highest first-class score - 234 against Manicaland, which performance brought him a recall to the Zimbabwe team for the 2003/04 tour of Australia.

He also played two seasons for Cranleigh Cricket Club in Surrey (1999 and 2004) totalling over 1,400 1st XI runs and 68 wickets.

He currently lives and works in Harare and has a family of two children.

References

1975 births
Living people
Zimbabwe One Day International cricketers
Zimbabwe Test cricketers
Zimbabwean cricketers
Manicaland cricketers
Mashonaland cricketers
Mashonaland A cricketers
Matabeleland cricketers
Alumni of St. George's College, Harare
Cricketers from Harare
White Zimbabwean sportspeople